Monastyr is a rural locality (a village) in Seyvinskoye Rural Settlement, Gaynsky District, Perm Krai, Russia. The population was 3 as of 2010.

Geography 
Monastyr is located 38 km southwest of Gayny (the district's administrative centre) by road. Pugvin Mys is the nearest rural locality.

References 

Rural localities in Gaynsky District